How We Robbed the Bank of Italy (a.k.a. Due uomini d'oro) is a 1966 Italian crime-comedy film directed and co-written by Lucio Fulci, and starring the comic duo Franco and Ciccio.

Plot
Franco and Ciccio are the brothers of Paolo "The Master", a major criminal plotting to rob the Bank of Italy. The two stupid thieves steal Paolo's plane and join forces with another group of inexperienced thieves in a scheme to rob the Bank themselves, before Paolo's gang can pull off the theft.

Cast 

 Franco Franchi: Franco
 Ciccio Ingrassia: Ciccio
 Mario Pisu: Paolo the "Master"
 Fiorenzo Fiorentini: Romoletto 
 Mirko Ellis: Mirko 
 Solvi Stubing: Selma 
 Alfredo Adami: Geremia  
 Umberto D'Orsi: Inspector 
 Luisa Rispoli: Paolo's Girlfriend
 Carlo Taranto: Pasquale Aniello
 Ignazio Leone: False Inspector 
 Enzo Andronico: Man with nervous tic
Ursula Janis : blonde girl at the guitar
Kitty Swan : brunette girl at nightclub

References

External links

How We Robbed the Bank of Italy at Variety Distribution

1960s crime comedy films
Films directed by Lucio Fulci
Italian heist films
Italian crime comedy films
Italian buddy comedy films
1960s buddy comedy films
1960s heist films
Films scored by Lallo Gori
1960s Italian-language films
1960s Italian films